Yatha Mawkun Alinkar is a 2018 Burmese drama television series. It aired on Burmese MRTV-4, from October 19 to November 20, 2018, on Mondays to Fridays at 20:45 for 23 episodes.

Cast
Aung Yay Chan as Yatha
Shinn Myat as Mawkun
Chue Lay as Alinkar
Hazel Nyi Nyi Htun as Moe Tain Hlwar
Ye Aung as U Kaung Myat
May Thinzar Oo as Daw Htar Htar May
Lu Mone as U Aung Gyi
Zin Myo as Soe Myint

References

Burmese television series
MRTV (TV network) original programming